James Haley may refer to:
 James A. Haley (1899–1981), U.S. Representative from Florida
 James L. Haley, American author of Texas history and fiction
 James Haley (rugby league) (born 1985), Irish rugby league player for Halifax
 James Haley (baseball) (fl. 1880), 19th century baseball player
 James Haley (pentathlete) (born 1969), American modern pentathlete, competitor at the 1992 Summer Olympics
 James Haley (sailor) (1824–1880), Medal of Honor recipient during the American Civil War 
 James T. Haley, author of the Afro-American Encyclopaedia and Sparkling Gems of Race Knowledge Worth Reading